Aponetius is a genus of east Asian ground spiders. It was first described by T. Kamura in 2020, and it has only been found in Japan. The type species, Aponetius gladius, was originally described under the name "Zelotes gladius".

Species
 it contains five species:
A. flexuosus (Kamura, 1999) – Japan (Ryukyu Is.)
A. gladius (Kamura, 1999) (type) – Japan (Ryukyu Is.)
A. ogatai Kamura, 2020 – Japan (Ryukyu Is.)
A. ryukyuensis (Kamura, 1999) – Japan (Ryukyu Is.)
A. watarii Kamura, 2020 – Japan (Ryukyu Is.)

See also
 Zelotes
 List of Gnaphosidae species

References

Further reading

Gnaphosidae genera
Endemic fauna of the Ryukyu Islands